KAFF or Kaff may refer to:

 KAFF (AM), a radio station (930 AM) licensed to Flagstaff, Arizona, United States
 KAFF Appliances, an Indian multi-national appliances firm based in Gurugram, India
 KAFF-FM, a radio station (92.9 FM) licensed to Flagstaff, Arizona, United States
 Kecskemét Animation Film Festival, an biennial animation film festival in Kecsemét, Hungary
 The IATA airport code for the airfield at the United States Air Force Academy
 Kaff Tagon, a fictional character in the webcomic Schlock Mercenary

See also
 Kaffe (disambiguation)